James McKenzie (April 23, 1854 – February 12, 1936) was a farmer and political figure in Manitoba. He represented Lakeside from 1896 to 1903 in the Legislative Assembly of Manitoba as a Liberal.

Background
McKenzie was born in Aberfoyle, Wellington County, Canada West, the son of Kenneth McKenzie and Jane Condy, both natives of Scotland. In 1895, McKenzie married Mary S. Hill. He was elected to the Manitoba assembly in an 1896 by-election held after John Gunion Rutherford resigned his seat.

McKenzie's Passing
At the age of 81 McKenzie died in Brandon.

References 

1854 births
1936 deaths
Farmers from Manitoba
Manitoba Liberal Party MLAs
Canadian people of Scottish descent